Grand Central Baking Company d.b.a. Grand Central Bakery is an American bakery chain with locations in Portland, Oregon, and Seattle, Washington and their metropolitan areas. It was founded in Seattle's Grand Central Hotel building, originally as The Bakery and later becoming Grand Central Bakery. The bakery is known for its artisan breads.

History
Grand Central was founded in 1989 by Gwyneth Bassetti in Seattle, beginning the local artisan bread movement in that city. Her son later opened Grand Central Bakery's first Portland location in 1993 on SE Hawthorne Boulevard. The company has grown to about 370 employees since then. Today, Grand Central Bakery has 11 cafes and two wholesale bakeries in the Portland and Seattle areas. It sells its baked goods in dozens of retailers across the Pacific Northwest.

Today

As of June 2018, Claire Randall has been Grand Central's CEO. Grand Central's head baker is Mel Darbyshire, overseeing the company's bread production in Seattle and Portland.

Grand Central has four shops in greater Seattle, in the Eastlake, Wedgwood and Wallingford neighborhoods as well is in Burien. In Portland, they have shops in the Hawthorne, Woodstock, Beaumont Village, Multnomah Village, Sellwood and Mississippi district neighborhoods as well as in Cedar Mill, an unincorporated area in Northwest Portland. They plan to open a shop in Hillsboro, just outside Portland, in 2023.

In a move designed to shield the 33-year-old company from any future sale and protect its mission in perpetuity, Grand Central Bakery announced plans in May 2022 to create a Perpetual Purpose Trust, a new type of corporate structure. As a Purpose Trust the bakery will no longer be owned by family and longtime employees but by the trust, which will preserve independence, values, mission and company culture.

References

External links

 
 Image of President Obama visiting Grand Central Bakery in 2010 from the White House

American companies established in 1989
Bakeries of the United States
Restaurants established in 1989
Restaurants in Portland, Oregon
Restaurants in Seattle